Željka Antunović (born 15 September 1955) is a Croatian former politician who served as acting president of the Social Democratic Party between April and June 2007, and as Minister of Defence from 2002 until 2003 in the second cabinet of Ivica Račan. She was the first and to date only female holder of the office.

Born in Virovitica, Antunović entered the political scene in 1990 when she joined Social Democrats of Croatia (SDH), a centre-left party formed after establishment of democracy across Yugoslavia – and originally a major rival of SDP, who had in turn recently succeeded the League of Communists of Croatia (SKH). However, following disastrous results of the SDH in parliamentary elections, the party accepted the SDP's offer of unification, which occurred in 1994. Antunović, together with Antun Vujić, gradually rose through the ranks of the SDP.

Antunović had served as a member of the Croatian Parliament from 1995 to 1999, and from 2003 onwards. At the party conference in 2000, she was elected as the deputy president of the SDP. Between 2000 and 2003, she served as Deputy Prime Minister of Croatia and was named the first woman to hold the portfolio of Defence in the second cabinet of Ivica Račan, serving from 2002 until the end of the cabinet's term in 2003.

On 31 January 2007, Račan announced that he was temporarily leaving politics due to health reasons. Antunović then took over the chairmanship of the party; and, on 11 April, following further deterioration in Račan's health, he resigned as leader of the party, leaving Antunović as head of the SDP until the next party convention. She ran for president at the party convention on 2 June 2007, together with Milan Bandić, Zoran Milanović and Tonino Picula. She was defeated by Milanović in the second round of voting.

After her retirement from politics, she started a consulting company. She took part in the Ivo Josipović's campaign for the 2014–15 Croatian presidential election.

References

External links
Željka Antunović at the Social Democratic Party of Croatia official website 
Željka Antunović at the Council of Europe website

1955 births
Living people
People from Virovitica
Social Democrats of Croatia politicians
Social Democratic Party of Croatia politicians
Faculty of Economics and Business, University of Zagreb alumni
Representatives in the modern Croatian Parliament
Defence ministers of Croatia
Female defence ministers
Women government ministers of Croatia
20th-century Croatian women politicians
20th-century Croatian politicians
21st-century Croatian women politicians
21st-century Croatian politicians